HobbyKids Adventures is an American children's Flash-animated web series created by Butch Hartman and produced by PocketWatch, Inc. and Billionfold, Inc. for the YouTube channel HobbyFamilyTV. The series follows the adventures of HobbyPig, HobbyFrog, HobbyBear, HobbyMom, and HobbyDad as they try to make the world a better place with their inventions while evading their archenemies, the SlobbyKids.

The series was released on YouTube on June 22, 2019. It also was released on the Nick Jr. app on July 26, 2019. The second season was released on September 21, 2019.

Premise
Based on the real-life YouTube family from HobbyFamilyTV, HobbyKids Adventures follows the adventures of HobbyPig, HobbyFrog, and HobbyBear as they use inventions to improve the world, only to get into mischief along the way.

Characters
 HobbyPig (voiced by Johnny Rose) - The oldest of the siblings. He is a beige pig who is the leader who jumps quickly into any new situation.
 HobbyFrog (voiced by Griffin Burns) - The middle child. Full of curiosity and bold ideas, he is a green frog who is the inventor who uses his skills to aid the HobbyKids in their adventures.
 HobbyBear (voiced by Cristina Milizia) - The youngest of the family. He is a blue bear cub who is known for his cuteness and often gets into mischief but loves having fun with his brothers.
 HobbyMom (voiced by Cristina Milizia) - A white rabbit and the HobbyKids' mother. She is a supportive parent who loves to have fun.
 HobbyDad (voiced by Johnny Rose) - A yellow Labrador retriever and the HobbyKids' father. Like HobbyMom, he enjoys fun adventures and always supports his family.
 SlobbyRat (voiced by Johnny Rose) - A rat who is the de facto leader of the SlobbyKids and often comes up with plans to defeat their archenemies, the HobbyKids.
 SlobbySkunk (voiced by Johnny Rose) - A striped skunk who is a member of the SlobbyKids.
 SlobbySnake (voiced by Butch Hartman and Griffin Burns) - An anaconda who is a member of the SlobbyKids.
 GamerGoose194 (voiced by Jace Diehl) - A goose who aids the Hobby Kids in their quest to find the perfect video title.
 HobbyButterfly (voiced by JillianTubeHD) - A butterfly who asks the HobbyKids if they have a sharpener for her pencil.

Episodes

Season 1 (2019)

Season 2 (2019–20)

Broadcast 
After first premiering on the HobbyFamilyTV YouTube channel on June 22, 2019, the series has since streamed on Hulu, Amazon Prime Video, and the Nickelodeon and Nick Jr. apps and has also aired on PocketWatch's 24/7 live-linear channel on Roku Kids & Family as well as on the Hobby Kids live-linear channel on Pluto Tv.

Reception 
The first episode of HobbyKids Adventures amassed over 1 million views on YouTube within 5 days of its release and was well received by audiences. To date, the series has received over 30 million total views on YouTube.

Merchandise 
HobbyKids Adventures merchandise are sold exclusively by Walmart. In July and August 2019, Star Pals kids' meal toys based on the show were sold at Hardee's and Carl's Jr.

References

External links

 

2019 web series debuts
2020 web series endings
American animated web series
American children's animated adventure television series
American children's animated comedy television series
American flash animated television series
2010s YouTube series
Television series created by Butch Hartman
2020s YouTube series
Animated television series about children
Animated television series about families